Navleen Kumar was a human rights activist in Maharashtra state, India who was murdered on 19 June 2002 in her apartment building in the state capital Mumbai.

When murdered, Navleen (aged 54) had been working for more than a decade to protect and restore the lands of Adivasis (indigenous peoples) in the Thane district through legal interventions at different courts. Places in the district, including Nalasopara, Virar and Vasai, at the time were witnessing rapid expansion being a suburb of India's financial capital Mumbai. It is alleged that land and property developers were using coercion and intimidation to get land transferred from locals. During the course of her work, Navleen  too received numerous threats, including one some months before the killing at the Nallasopara Railway Station.

On the fateful morning of 19 June, at around 7:30 AM Indian Time, while she was walking her two dogs (Pomeranian breed) on the terrace of her apartment building, she was attacked by a group of men with knives. She was inflicted with 19 stab wounds and subsequently died on the spot. One of her dogs also sustained knife injuries as it tried to save her. The dog however survived. It is reported that the assailants had been keeping an eye on her activities for some time before the incident.

After her death, many people say that it was Navleen Kumar's integrity and commitment that led to her murder. One human rights activists said of her: "She was not a person. She was a power".

Killing of her husband 
Navleen's husband, Murali Kumar, a journalist, had also been murdered, reportedly by members of the same group that murdered Navleen some years ago. The killers of her husband were never apprehended.

Aftermath of the killing
Following her killing, noted civil society members and human rights activists from different parts of India continuously campaigned for justice for Navleen Kumar. They wrote a public letter to then Chief Minister of Maharashtra, Vilasrao Deshmukh, drawing his attention to the killing and demanding justice.

In January 2003, Navleen was posthumously awarded a sum of (Indian) Rupees One Lakh (One hundred thousand), about US$2100, by Public Concern for Governance Trust, that, inter alia, confers such awards annually to people fighting injustice and exploitation.

Mention in Rabbi Shergill's song - Bilquis 
Navleen Kumar, the Nallasopara area and the acquisition of tribal land in the area has been mentioned in a stanza in Rabbi Shergill, a popular pop Indian singer's new album, Avengi Ja Nahin, song Bilquis (Jinhein Naaz Hai) (translated: Bilquis (Those who take pride)).

References 

1940s births
2002 deaths
Indian women activists
Indian human rights activists
Indian murder victims
Activists from Maharashtra
Adivasi activists
20th-century Indian women
20th-century Indian people
People from Mumbai
Women from Maharashtra